Vern Tincher is a former Democratic member of the Indiana House of Representatives, representing the 46th District from 2004 to 2010. He earlier served from 1996 through 2002, and from 1982 through 1994.

References

External links
Indiana State Legislature - Representative Vern Tincher Official government website
Representative Vern Tincher Official website
Project Vote Smart - Representative Vern Tincher (IN) profile
Follow the Money - Vern Tincher
2008 2006 2004 2002 2000 1998 1996 1994 campaign contributions

Democratic Party members of the Indiana House of Representatives
1936 births
Living people
Tincher family
People from Mitchell, Indiana